The Mile High Music Festival was an annual two-day concert that took place for three years.  It was held in Commerce City, Colorado at Dick's Sporting Goods Park, first done on July 19 and 20, 2008.  The concert was originally scheduled to be held at City Park in Denver (near the Denver Zoo), but changed because of opposition from zoo officials.
2010 was the last year and promoter AEG announced that the festival would be cancelled for 2011 "due to the economy"

2010 lineup

August 14
Jack Johnson
Steve Miller Band
Slightly Stoopid
Phoenix
Nas & Damian Marley
Keane
Cypress Hill
Derek Trucks & Susan Tedeschi Band
The Samples
Keller Williams
Rusted Root
Donavon Frankenreiter
Amos Lee
Mayer Hawthorne & The County
ALO
One eskimO
The Constellations
The Motet
Snake Rattle Rattle Snake
Houses
Bobby Long
The Chain Gang of 1974

August 15
Dave Matthews Band
Weezer
My Morning Jacket
Atmosphere
Train
Jimmy Cliff
Bassnectar
Z-Trip
Drive-By Truckers
Railroad Earth
Ozomatli
Punch Brothers featuring Chris Thile
Tim Reynolds & TR3
Trevor Hall
Matt Morris
Boombox
Oh My Stars
Joe Purdy
The Knew
Danielle Ate the Sandwich
The Epilogues

2009 lineup

July 18
Tool
Widespread Panic
Incubus
Ben Harper & Relentless7
G. Love & Special Sauce
Ani DiFranco
The Black Keys
Galactic
Paolo Nutini
Gomez
The Greyboy Allstars
Railroad Earth
India.arie
Lyrics Born
Rocco Deluca & The Burden
Needtobreathe
Band of Heathens
Davy Knowles & Back Door Slam
Set Forth
Early Pearl

July 19
Widespread Panic
The Fray
Gov't Mule
Thievery Corporation
3OH!3
Buddy Guy
John Butler
DeVotchKa
Gogol Bordello
Galactic
Guster
The Wailers
Matisyahu
Robert Randolph and the Family Band
Mat Kearney
Dead Confederate
Jack's Mannequin
Jerry Joseph & the Jackmormons
Erin McCarley
Paper Bird
honeyhoney
Joe Pug
Electric Touch
Strange Condition

2008 lineup

Dave Matthews Band
Tom Petty
John Mayer
O.A.R.
The Roots
moe.
Leftover Salmon
Citizen Cope
Martin Sexton
Andrew Bird
Josh Ritter
Ingrid Michaelson
Rose Hill Drive

The Photo Atlas
Serena Ryder
The Railbenders
Pinback
Born in the Flood
The New Mastersounds
The Black Crowes
Spoon
Michael Franti & Spearhead
Rodrigo y Gabriela
Steve Winwood
Flogging Molly

Colbie Caillat
OneRepublic
Meese
Newton Faulkner
Tea Leaf Green
Lupe Fiasco
Brett Dennen
Bob Schneider
Grace Potter and the Nocturnals
State Radio
Stephen Kellogg and the Sixers
Flobots
Gavin DeGraw
Jason Mraz
Mofro
Eric Hutchinson

References

External links
 - Main site
http://www.stateofmindmusic.com/?entry=321 - State of Mind - Photos from Mile High Festival

Commerce City, Colorado
Music festivals in Colorado
Rock festivals in the United States
Tourist attractions in Adams County, Colorado
Recurring events established in 2008
Recurring events disestablished in 2010
2008 establishments in Colorado
2010 disestablishments in Colorado